The short-tailed brush-furred rat (Lophuromys brevicaudus)  is a species of rodent in the family Muridae. It is found only in Ethiopia. Its natural habitats are subtropical or tropical high-altitude shrubland and subtropical or tropical high-altitude grassland. It is threatened by habitat loss.

References

Endemic fauna of Ethiopia
Lophuromys
Mammals of Ethiopia
Mammals described in 1936
Taxonomy articles created by Polbot